Louis Midelair (14 June 1856 – 7 November 1916) was a Belgian-born French fencer. He competed in the men's masters sabre event at the 1900 Summer Olympics. He represented France at the 1900 Summer Olympics in Paris, competing in the saber tournament for masters, where he was eliminated in Pool B, won by Italo Santelli.

References

External links
 

1856 births
1916 deaths
French male sabre fencers
Olympic fencers of France
Fencers at the 1900 Summer Olympics
Sportspeople from Brussels